Jennifer F. Reinganum is an American economist. She lives in Nashville, Tennessee where she is the E. Bronson Ingram Professor of Economics at Vanderbilt University. She has been a professor of economics since 1995. Reinganum was the president of the American Law and Economics Association for 2012 and has received multiple grant awards from the National Science Foundation.

Education
Jennifer F. Reinganum received two bachelor's degrees, one in Mathematics and one in Economics, from Oberlin College in 1976. She continued her education at Northwestern University where she received her master's degree in Quantitative Methods in 1978. Reinganum stayed at Northwestern and received her Ph.D. in Managerial Economics and Decision Sciences in 1979.

References

Year of birth missing (living people)
Living people
American women economists
20th-century American economists
21st-century American economists
Oberlin College alumni
Northwestern University alumni
Vanderbilt University faculty
Fellows of the Econometric Society
20th-century American women